Jamesia multivittata is a species of beetle in the family Cerambycidae. It was described by Henry Walter Bates in 1869. It is known from Nicaragua, Ecuador, Costa Rica, and Panama.

References

Onciderini
Beetles described in 1869